Albert Kopytich (born 12 June 2002) is a Belarusian professional footballer who plays for Smorgon on loan from Neman Grodno.

References

External links 
 
 

 

2002 births
Living people
Belarusian footballers
Association football forwards
FC Neman Grodno players
FC Smorgon players